is a Japanese professional sumo wrestler from Kashiwa, Chiba. He made his professional debut in March 2010, reaching the top makuuchi division in September 2018. His highest rank has been sekiwake. He has won two prizes for Fighting Spirit and one for Outstanding Performance. He has one gold star for defeating a yokozuna while ranked as a maegashira. He has been a runner-up in two top division tournaments. He wrestles for Tokiwayama stable.

Career
Takanoshō was the fourth of six children, and it was noted early on that he had the physique for sumo, being much bigger than all his siblings . He took part in a local sumo tournament in his first year of elementary school, and in junior high he represented Chiba Prefecture in the team competition at the National Junior High School Sumo Championships. Future makuuchi wrestler Daishōhō was on the same team. Upon graduating from junior high he entered Chiganoura stable (since renamed), run by ex-sekiwake Masudayama. He reached the sandanme division in July 2011, and the makushita division in May 2012. In 2014 he twice fell back to sandanme but returned immediately both times, and had established himself as a makushita regular by January 2015. In April 2016 his stablemaster retired and the stable moved to the Takanohana ichimon, with former komusubi Takamisugi taking over as head coach. Benefiting from increased training opportunities at the Takanohana and Ōnomatsu stables, he earned promotion to the sekitori ranks with a 6–1 record at makushita 3 in September 2017. To mark the occasion he changed his shikona to Takanoshō, reflecting his change of stablemaster. He was the first wrestler from Kashiwa to win promotion to the jūryō division since Kirinji 44 years earlier.

Takanoshō came through with a winning record in his jūryō debut in November 2017, and in July 2018 scored 13 wins against two losses from jūryō 4, although he lost a playoff for the championship to Takanoiwa. He was the first wrestler to win 13 bouts in jūryō and not take the championship since Ichinojō in July 2014. Nevertheless, he was promoted to the top makuuchi division for the following September 2018 tournament. He told a press conference that previously makuuchi was just a world seen on TV, and he was glad to see his name in the top part of the banzuke. His stablemaster said he hoped that Takanoshō would eventually reach san'yaku. In his makuuchi debut he was aiming for double-digit wins and the Fighting Spirit special prize, but this became impossible after his sixth loss on Day 13, and he ended the tournament with an 8–7 record. (This became the first tournament since special prizes were introduced in 1947 that none were awarded at all.) He produced a disappointing 4–11 record in November 2018 and was demoted back to jūryō. In January 2019 he suffered a right anterior cruciate ligament injury and he pulled out on Day 3, only to attempt a comeback on Day 9. However, he ended up withdrawing again on Day 11. He fell to jūryō 13 in March but returned from injury with an 11–4 record. He won promotion back to the top division after the September 2019 tournament, and produced his best makuuchi score to date of 10–5 in November. This saw him promoted to a career-high rank of maegashira 9 for the January 2020 tournament. In March he produced his best score in the top division to date, finishing joint runner-up with Kakuryū on 12–3. He was awarded his first special prize, for Fighting Spirit. In the November 2020 tournament he made his san'yaku debut at sekiwake, and came through with a winning record of 8–7. In December he revealed that he was again having problems with the anterior cruciate ligament injury in his right knee, for which surgery was recommended, but he planned to resume training instead. He maintained his sekiwake rank with winning records in January and March 2021, but a 5–10 record in May saw him fall back to the maegashira ranks. In November 2021 he earned a share of the Fighting Spirit prize by defeating Abi on Day 15 to finish with an 11–4 record. This saw at sekiwake rank for the fifth time for the January 2022 tournament, although a 7–8 record meant he fell to komusubi in March, his first time at that rank.

Takanoshō earned his first kinboshi, or gold star, in the May 2022 tournament by defeating yokozuna Terunofuji. He led the field outright until losing to Wakatakakage on Day 13, and was still in contention for the championship on the final day, although he was defeated by Sadanoumi and had to settle for a share of second place, one win behind Terunofuji. He was awarded his first Outstanding Performance Prize.

Fighting style
Takanoshō is an oshi-sumo wrestler, who prefers to push and thrust at his opponents rather than grapple with the mawashi or belt. His most common winning kimarite or technique is oshi-dashi, a straightforward push out.

Personal life
He is a fan of the band One Ok Rock and got to meet them after they performed in Fukuoka Prefecture on 27 November 2019, where Takanoshō was on a regional sumo tour.

Career record

See also
List of sekiwake
List of active sumo wrestlers
List of sumo tournament top division runners-up
Active special prize winners

References

External links

1994 births
Living people
Japanese sumo wrestlers
Sumo people from Chiba Prefecture
Sekiwake